Novocherkassk (BDK-46) is a  of the Russian Navy. It is a part of the Black Sea Fleet and was damaged while in port during the 2022 Russian invasion of Ukraine.

Description 
It is capable of carrying up to 500 tons of cargo and 225 embarked soldiers. It is armed with two AK-725 57 mm artillery mounts and two 122 mm multiple rocket launch systems.

History 

Novocherkassk took part in an operation with other Black Sea Fleet ships in anchoring off the coast of Gaza in November 2012. The ship movement was ostensibly to prepare to evacuate Russian citizens from Israel in case the Israeli-Palestinian conflict there escalated. In 2015, Novocherkassk was a part of Black Sea Fleet exercises in the Mediterranean which corresponded with a Russian buildup of military forces in Syria. The ships' movement spurred concerns over the spread of the COVID-19 virus from and to Russia.

In March 2022, roughly a month into Russia's invasion of Ukraine, Novocherkassk was docked in the port of Berdiansk in southern Ukraine with several other Russian warships. Ukrainian shelling on 25 March damaged several Russian ships there, sinking Saratov and damaging Novocherkassk. By June 2022, Russian state media outlet TASS claimed that Novocherkassk was one of twelve landing ships in the Black Sea that could launch an amphibious operation on Ukraine. However, Novocherkassk was not confirmed to be repaired and its status remained unknown.

References 

Landing craft
Ships of the Russian Navy
Ships involved in the 2022 Russian invasion of Ukraine
1987 ships
Ropucha-class landing ships